Catherine Jones, Katie or Kate Jones may refer to:
Lady Catherine Jones (1672–1740), patron of arts
Cathy Jones (born 1955), Canadian writer
Catherine Jones (novelist) (born 1956), British novelist
Catherine Zeta-Jones (born 1969), Welsh actress
Catherine Jones (journalist) (born 1971), English journalist
Katie Jones (web entrepreneur) (born 1971), English web personality
Kate Jones (scientist) (born 1972), British biodiversity scientist
Katie Rowley Jones (born c. 1978), British musical theatre actress
Kate Jones (born 1979), Australian politician
Catherine Ann Jones, playwright, screenwriter, and author

See also 
Katherine Jones, Viscountess Ranelagh (1615–1691), British scientist
Jeffrey Catherine Jones (1944–2011), American artist